Morsch is a surname. Notable people with the surname include:

Gary Morsch (born 1952), American physician, philanthropist, and author
Ikina Morsch (born 1956), Dutch gymnast
J. Durward Morsch (1920–2015), American composer
Lucile M. Morsch (1906–1972), American librarian